Isis Poon Lok Yan (born 22 August 1991) is a badminton player from Hong Kong. She competed at the 2012 and 2016 Summer Olympics in women's doubles event.

Together with Tse Ying Suet, she has received her best competitive results in Women's Doubles. Their breakout performance was at the 2011 India Super Series where they reached the semifinals. They matched that result at the 2011 Japan Super Series and qualified for the 2012 London Olympics. At 2012 Japan Super Series, she together with Tse Ying Suet won the champion of women's doubles by beating 4 Japan pairs consecutively.

Achievements

BWF World Junior Championships 
Girls' doubles

BWF Superseries 
The BWF Superseries, launched on 14 December 2006 and implemented in 2007, is a series of elite badminton tournaments, sanctioned by Badminton World Federation (BWF). BWF Superseries has two level such as Superseries and Superseries Premier. A season of Superseries features twelve tournaments around the world, which introduced since 2011, with successful players invited to the BWF Superseries Finals held at the year end.

Women's doubles

  BWF Superseries Premier tournament
  BWF Superseries tournament

BWF Grand Prix 
The BWF Grand Prix has two levels, the Grand Prix and Grand Prix Gold. It is a series of badminton tournaments sanctioned by the Badminton World Federation (BWF) since 2007.

Women's doubles

  BWF Grand Prix Gold tournament
  BWF Grand Prix tournament

BWF International Challenge/Series 
Women's doubles

Mixed doubles

  BWF International Challenge tournament
  BWF International Series tournament

Record against selected opponents 
Record against year-end Finals finalists, World Championships semi-finalists, and Olympic quarter-finalists.

Tse Ying Suet

References

External links 
 
 

1991 births
Living people
Hong Kong female badminton players
Badminton players at the 2012 Summer Olympics
Badminton players at the 2016 Summer Olympics
Olympic badminton players of Hong Kong
Badminton players at the 2010 Asian Games
Badminton players at the 2014 Asian Games
Asian Games competitors for Hong Kong
21st-century Hong Kong women